The Blackwell Inn is an upscale full-service hotel located on-campus at The Ohio State University in Columbus, Ohio. It is located adjacent to The Max M. Fisher College of Business. The Blackwell Inn is named after Roger Blackwell, a marketing professor who pledged $7 million to the university in 2001. Ohio State operates the hotel, and it is the only hotel located on campus. Dining includes Bistro 2110 on the ground floor and The Blackwell Lounge.

History 
The Blackwell Inn was built as a part of Phase III of the Fisher College of Business. It first opened to the public in 2002.

See also
The Ohio State University
Max M. Fisher College of Business

References

External links
http://www.theblackwell.com/

Ohio State University
Hotels in Columbus, Ohio
University District (Columbus, Ohio)